Igor Bachner (born 16 September 1946) is a retired Czech-Canadian soccer player.

Career
Bachner began his career with TJ Škoda Plzeň, and would appear in the 1971–72 European Cup Winners' Cup as Škoda lost to FC Bayern Munich.

He played in the NASL between 1973 and 1979 for the Montreal Olympique, Boston Minutemen, San Diego Sockers and Rochester Lancers. In 1975, he played in the National Soccer League with Montreal Castors.for three seasons. In late 1977, Bachner along with six Montreal players were traded to the Ottawa Tigers in order to assist in their playoff match against Toronto Croatia to gain promotion to the NSL First Division. The transaction provided Montreal the bargaining rights to Mick Jones.

He spent one season with the Hartford Hellions of the Major Indoor Soccer League.

References

Living people
Boston Minutemen players
Canadian expatriate sportspeople in the United States
Canadian expatriate soccer players
Canadian soccer players
Canadian people of Czech descent
Czechoslovak emigrants to Canada
Expatriate soccer players in the United States
Hartford Hellions players
Association football midfielders
Major Indoor Soccer League (1978–1992) players
Montreal Olympique players
Naturalized citizens of Canada
North American Soccer League (1968–1984) players
Rochester Lancers (1967–1980) players
San Diego Sockers (NASL) players
FC Viktoria Plzeň players
Montreal Castors players
1946 births
Canadian National Soccer League players